Mazhu is a 1982 Indian Malayalam film, directed by P. K. Krishnan and produced by Joye Palliyan and K. P. Mohammed. The film stars Sathaar, Sukumaran, Balan K. Nair and Lalithasree in the lead roles. The film score is by Shyam.

Cast
Sathaar
Sukumaran
Balan K. Nair
Lalithasree
Nellikode Bhaskaran
Rathidevi

Soundtrack
The music was composed by Shyam and the lyrics were written by Poovachal Khader.

References

External links
 

1982 films
1980s Malayalam-language films
Films scored by Shyam (composer)